Ethel Johnson (8 October 1908 – 30 March 1964) was an English athlete who competed for Great Britain in the 1932 Summer Olympics.  She was born in Westhoughton, Lancashire and was a member of Bolton United Harriers.

In 1932, she was one of a team of five women entered by the Women's Amateur Athletic Association at the 1932 Los Angeles Summer Olympics as Britain's first female Olympians in athletics events, together with Gwendoline Porter, Eileen Hiscock, Nellie Halstead, and seventeen-year-old Violet Webb. They sailed for five days from Southampton to Quebec and then travelled a further 3000 miles by train before arriving in Los Angeles. Ethel was eliminated in the first round of the Olympic 100 metre contest. and had to be replaced due to injury by Violet Webb in the women's 4x100 metres relay.

At the 1934 Empire Games she was a member of the English relay team which won the silver medal in the 220-110-220-110 yards relay competition (with Eileen Hiscock, Nellie Halstead, Johnson and Ivy Walker). In the 100 yards competition she finished fifth and in the 220 yards contest she finished sixth.

References

External links
sports-reference.com

1908 births
1964 deaths
People from Westhoughton
English female sprinters
Olympic athletes of Great Britain
Athletes (track and field) at the 1932 Summer Olympics
Athletes (track and field) at the 1934 British Empire Games
Commonwealth Games silver medallists for England
Commonwealth Games medallists in athletics
Women's World Games medalists
Olympic female sprinters
Medallists at the 1934 British Empire Games